The knockout stage of the 2015 Copa América began on 24 June 2015 and finished with the final on 4 July 2015. A total of eight teams competed in the knockout stage.

Qualified teams
The top two placed teams from each of the three groups, plus the two best-placed third teams, qualified for the knockout stage.

Bracket
In the knockout stage, the eight teams played a single-elimination tournament, with the following rules:
In the quarter-finals, teams from the same group could not play each other.
In the quarter-finals, semi-finals, and third place playoff, if tied after 90 minutes, a penalty shoot-out was used to determine the winner (no extra time was played).
In the final, if tied after 90 minutes, 30 minutes of extra time were played. If still tied after extra time, a penalty shoot-out was used to determine the winner.

Scores after extra time are indicated by (a.e.t.), and penalty shoot-out are indicated by (p).

All times local, CLT (UTC−3).

Quarter-finals

Chile vs Uruguay

Bolivia vs Peru

Argentina vs Colombia

Brazil vs Paraguay

Semi-finals

Chile vs Peru

Argentina vs Paraguay

Third place play-off

Final

References

External links
 (Official website) 
Copa América 2015, CONMEBOL.com 

Knockout stage
knock
knock
knock
knock
2015 in Paraguayan football
2014–15 in Bolivian football
2015 in Peruvian football
2015 in Colombian football